The Thai Human Imagery Museum is a wax museum located in Nakhon Pathom Province, Thailand. Due to the tropical climate of Thailand the figures are made of fibreglass instead of the traditional wax.

History

The museum was opened on 14 June 1989. Thai Human Imagery Museum created by inspired Artist Duangkaew Phityakornsilp and his colleagues with an aim to promote and to preserve traditional Thai arts and culture. These artists spent over 10 years studying and experimenting on wax sculpture using fibre glass before succeeding in creating beautiful, exquisite, and durable ones.

Exhibitions
Exhibits include Thai historical figures, including kings of the Chakri Dynasty, displays of Thai culture and traditions, and famous fictional characters, including those from Sunthorn Phu's epic poem, Phra Aphai Mani.

See also

 Tourism in Thailand

References

External links
 Thailand Human Imagery Museum - official site
 Thai Human Imagery Museum - information

Buildings and structures in Nakhon Pathom province
History museums in Thailand
Wax museums
Tourist attractions in Nakhon Pathom province
1989 establishments in Thailand